"Give Me My Arrows And Give Me My Bow" is a ballad written and composed by Samuel Lover in 1848. Lovers, an Irish songwriter and novelist, wrote the ballad during a trip to the United States.

Preface
Lover prefaced the poem with an introductory story:

Poem/Ballad

Title
The song title came from the first line of "The Samoyeds", a poem by Rev. Isaac Taylor.

References

Bibliography
—. "Our Portrait Gallery.—No. LXII: Samuel Lover". pp. 196–206, The Dublin University Magazine: Literary and Political Journal. No. CCXVII (February 1851) Vol XXXVI. Dublin: James McGlashan.
Lover, Samuel. Songs and Ballads. London: David Bryce (1858).
Lover, Samuel. "Give Me My Arrows And Give Me My Bow" (Sheet music). New York: Firth, Pond & Co. (1848).
Taylor, Isaac, Rev. Scenes in Asia: for the Amusement and Instruction of Little Tarry-at-Home Travellers. London: St. Paul's Church-Yard (1826).

1848 songs